The 2015–16 Swiss Cup is the 91st season of Switzerland's annual football cup competition. The competition started on 15 August 2015 with the first games of Round 1 and ended on 29 May 2016 with the Final, won by FC Zürich. As winners of the competition they qualified for the group stage of the 2016–17 UEFA Europa League. The reigning title holders were Sion.

Participating clubs
All teams from 2014–15 Super League and 2014–15 Challenge League as well as the top 4 teams from 2014–15 Promotion League automatically entered this year's competition. The remaining 41 teams had to qualify through separate qualifying rounds within their leagues. Reserve teams and teams from Liechtenstein are not allowed in the competition, the latter only enter the 2015–16 Liechtenstein Cup.

TH Title holders.

Round 1
Teams from Super League and Challenge League were seeded in this round. In a match, the home advantage was granted to the team from the lower league, if applicable. Teams in bold continue to the next round of the competition.

Round 2
The winners of Round 1 played in this round. Teams from Super League were seeded, the home advantage was granted to the team from the lower league, if applicable. Teams in bold continue to the third round.

|-
|colspan="3" style="background-color:#99CCCC"|18 September 2015

|-
|colspan="3" style="background-color:#99CCCC"|19 September 2015

|-
|colspan="3" style="background-color:#99CCCC"|20 September 2015

|}

Round 3
The winners of Round 2 played in this round. The home advantage was granted to the team from the lower league. Teams in bold continue to the quarter-finals.

|-
|colspan="3" style="background-color:#99CCCC"|28 October 2015

|-
|colspan="3" style="background-color:#99CCCC"|29 October 2015

|}

Quarter-finals
The winners of Round 3 played in the Quarter-finals. There was no home advantage granted in the draw. Teams in bold continue to the next round.

Semi-finals

Final

References

External links
 Official site 
 Official site 

Swiss Cup seasons
Swiss Cup
Cup